Geitodoris immunda is a species of sea slug or dorid nudibranch, a marine gastropod mollusk in the family Discodorididae.

Taxonomy
This species as well as Geitodoris planata are similar to Geitodoris pusae. Further review is necessary to clarify the taxonomic status of these taxa.

Distribution 
Distribution of Geitodoris immunda includes Gulf of Mexico, Costa Rica, Venezuela, Brazil and Panama.

Description
The body is oval. Mantle is moderately rigid. Dorsum is with a complex network of low ridges covering the entire surface, with some conical tubercles at the intersections. Branchial sheaths are with characteristic wavy edges. Background color is grayish-brown with numerous opaque white dots and some darker brown areas. Rhinophores and gill are brown with white tips. The maximum recorded body length is 43 mm.

Ecology
It was found under coral rubble in a reef habitat in Panama. Minimum recorded depth is 5.5 m. Maximum recorded depth is 5.5 m.

References
This article incorporates Creative Commons (CC-BY-4.0) text from the reference

External links

Discodorididae
Gastropods described in 1894